Chori Chori may refer to:
 Chori Chori (1956 film), an Indian Hindi-language romantic comedy film
 Chori Chori (2003 film), an Indian Hindi-language romantic comedy-drama film

See also
 Chori Chori Chupke Chupke, a 2001 Indian Hindi-language romantic drama film